Thurberiphaga is a monotypic moth genus of the family Noctuidae erected by Harrison Gray Dyar Jr. in 1920. Its only species, Thurberiphaga diffusa, was first described by William Barnes in 1904.

Distribution
Thurberiphaga diffusa can be found only in southern Arizona in the United States.

Flight
This moth is on wing from July to September.

Life cycle
The caterpillar bores into the stem of the host plant. It is a pinkish color and is covered with rough setae.

Host plants
Its only host plant is wild cotton (Gossypium thurberi).

References

Moths of North America
Hadeninae
Moths described in 1904
Monotypic moth genera